Fernanda Cuadra Delgado (Fernanda Cuadra Bølgen) (born September 7, 1984) is a Nicaraguan former swimmer, who specialized in individual medley events. Cuadra qualified for the Summer Olympics as a 15-year-old and swam for Nicaragua in the women's 200 m individual medley at the 2000 Summer Olympics in [Sydney]. Cuadra did not advance into the semifinals.

References

1984 births
Living people
Nicaraguan female swimmers
Olympic swimmers of Nicaragua
Swimmers at the 2000 Summer Olympics
Female medley swimmers
Sportspeople from Managua